Michael Joseph Noonan (4 August 1935 – 17 September 2013) was an Irish Fianna Fáil politician. He served as Minister for Defence from 1987 until 1989.

Michael J. Noonan was born in Bruff, County Limerick in 1935. He was educated locally at Salesian College in Limerick before graduating from University College Cork with a Diploma in Rural Science. Following his education, Noonan worked as a farmer before becoming involved in politics. He first entered local politics when he was elected to Limerick County Council in 1967, and remained a member of that council until 1991. He was elected to Dáil Éireann on his first attempt as a Fianna Fáil TD for the Limerick West constituency at the 1969 general election.

Noonan supported Charles Haughey in his successful bid at the 1979 Fianna Fáil leadership election. He owned a 100-acre dairy farm in Crean, where Haughey formally opened an extension to the milking parlour in 1980. In 1983, he was appointed as spokesperson on Agriculture.

Noonan was appointed Minister for Defence in 1987. He caused some controversy in this role, and got into conflict with the Irish Army over the issue of pay. After the 1989 general election Fianna Fáil went into coalition with the Progressive Democrats, and Noonan was the major casualty to accommodate the new ministers. He was appointed Minister of State at the Department of the Marine and remained in this office until February 1992, when Albert Reynolds became Taoiseach, and Noonan was not re-appointed.

He remained a controversial figure on the backbenches. He lost the Fianna Fáil whip twice during the 27th Dáil. In March 1993, he lost the whip after suggesting that Taoiseach Albert Reynolds was not fit to lead the party because he was open to altering Articles 2 and 3 of the Constitution of Ireland which laid a claim to Northern Ireland as part of the national territory; he was re-admitted to the parliamentary party in January 1995, after Bertie Ahern had succeeded as party leader and the party had gone into opposition. He lost the whip a second time in October 1995 by abstaining in vote the divorce referendum bill in the Dáil. In a statement released after his expulsion he attacked Ahern, accusing him of "destroying" Fianna Fáil and described his leadership as a "dictatorship". He was readmitted to the parliamentary party in May 1997, just before the dissolution of the 27th Dáil. He retired from political life at the 1997 general election.

He died on 17 September 2013.

References

 

1935 births
2013 deaths
Irish farmers
Fianna Fáil TDs
Members of the 19th Dáil
Members of the 20th Dáil
Members of the 21st Dáil
Members of the 22nd Dáil
Members of the 23rd Dáil
Members of the 24th Dáil
Members of the 25th Dáil
Members of the 26th Dáil
Members of the 27th Dáil
Politicians from County Limerick
Local councillors in County Limerick
Alumni of University College Cork
Ministers for Defence (Ireland)
Ministers of State of the 26th Dáil